Best of the West is an American sitcom that aired on ABC from September 1981 through August 1982.

Synopsis
The Old West spoof featured the misadventures of Sam Best (Joel Higgins), a Civil War veteran who becomes a marshal in Copper Creek after accidentally scaring off an incompetent gunfighter called the Calico Kid (Christopher Lloyd).

Sam's family was made up of his Southern-belle wife Elvira (Carlene Watkins) and his smart-mouthed son Daniel (Meeno Peluce).  The cast also included Leonard Frey as villain Parker Tillman, Tom Ewell as drunken town doctor Jerome Kullens, and Tracey Walter as Tillman's clueless but kind-hearted henchman, Frog Rothchild, Jr.

Cast
Joel Higgins as Sam Best
Carlene Watkins as Elvira Best
Tracey Walter as Frog Rothchild, Jr.
Meeno Peluce as Daniel Best
Tom Ewell as Jerome Kullens
Leonard Frey as Parker Tillman

Episodes

Cancellation
The series got off to a rough start, due to the pilot episode's pre-emption on the West Coast due to a special Thursday airing of a Pittsburgh Steelers-Miami Dolphins game running long. In the Eastern United States, the pilot served as the lead-in to the aforementioned game and was not affected by the NFL, though in any event the game would have aired in its entirety in Pittsburgh (via WTAE-TV) and Miami (via WPLG) due to the NFL's broadcasting contracts as a result of the 1968 Heidi Game. While western markets would not be affected by the NFL broadcasting rules and could have cut early from the game (a 30-10 Dolphins victory that was decided early), most ABC affiliates opted to still air the game in its entirety and pre-empt the episode in favor of their local news starting early. This mishap caused for the pilot episode of the series to flop, and ratings never recovered.

ABC delayed in renewing the series for a second season. Rather than wait for a renewal, Joel Higgins signed on to star in the new series Silver Spoons on NBC. At that point, ABC announced that it had decided to renew but was cancelling due to the star's departure.

Noted guest stars
In its short run, the show managed to feature an array of guest stars.  The list of noted actors and actresses who appeared include:
Dixie Carter in Episode #19 – "The Pretty Prisoner"
Andy Griffith in Episode #5 – "The Reunion"
Al Lewis in Episodes #6 and #7 – "They're Hanging Parker Tillman, Parts 1 and 2"
Christopher Lloyd in Episode #1 – "Pilot," Episode #4 – "The Calico Kid Returns," and Episode #15 – "The Calico Kid Goes to School"
Richard Moll in Episode #2 – "The Prisoner"
Slim Pickens in Episode #2 – "The Prisoner"
John Randolph in Episode #11 – "The Railroad"
Betty White in Episode #3 – "Mail Order Bride"

DVD release
On October 3, 2017, the Complete Series was released on manufactured-on-demand DVD by CBS DVD (distributed by Paramount).

References

External links

1980s American sitcoms
1981 American television series debuts
1982 American television series endings
American Broadcasting Company original programming
Television series by CBS Studios
Television shows set in Montana
English-language television shows
1980s Western (genre) television series